Marcelo Chirico (born March 16, 1992 in Rivera) is a Uruguayan equestrian and show jumping competitor.

At the 2010 Summer Youth Olympics in Singapore, Chirico won the gold medal in the individual jumping event, becoming the first athlete from Uruguay to win an individual Olympic Gold medal.

In September 2011, Chirico was named the flag bearer for the Uruguayan team at the 2011 Pan American Games in Guadalajara, Mexico.

Horses 
Links Hot Gossip - 2010
Omanie du Landais - 2011-2012
Mondain Normand - 2012

Career highlights 
2009
 1st place in the Campeonato Gaúcho for Young Riders Porto Alegre, Brazil
2010
 Gold medal at the 2010 Summer Youth Olympics in Singapore
 1st place in the Campeonato Gaúcho for Young Riders Porto Alegre, Brazil
2011
 1st place in the Campeonato Gaúcho for Young Riders Porto Alegre, Brazil
 1st place in the Sol de Mayo Tournament Buenos Aires, Argentina
 4th place in the CSI-W Haras Larissa São Paulo, Brazil
 43rd place in the 2011 Pan American Games
2012
 5th place in the CSI** Hardelot, France
 5th place in the CSI** Metz, France

References

1992 births
Living people
People from Rivera Department
Uruguayan male equestrians
Equestrians at the 2010 Summer Youth Olympics
Equestrians at the 2011 Pan American Games
Equestrians at the 2015 Pan American Games
Equestrians at the 2019 Pan American Games
Pan American Games competitors for Uruguay
Youth Olympic gold medalists for Uruguay
21st-century Uruguayan people